A partial lunar eclipse took place on Thursday, May 13, 1976, the first of two lunar eclipses in 1976, the second being a penumbral lunar eclipse on November 6, 1976. At maximum eclipse, a small bite out of the Moon should have been visible. The eclipse lasted for 1 hour, 15 minutes and 23.8 seconds, with just 12.17% of the Moon in shadow at maximum. Occurring only 1.1 days after perigee (Perigee on Wednesday, May 12, 1976), the Moon's apparent diameter 5.4% larger than average.

Eclipse season 
This is the second eclipse this season.

First eclipse this season: Annular solar eclipse of April 29, 1976

Saros series 
Lunar Saros 140, repeating every 18 years and 11 days, has a total of 77 lunar eclipse events including 28 total lunar eclipses. This is the 22nd member of Lunar Saros 140. The previous event was the May 1958 lunar eclipse. The next event is the May 1994 lunar eclipse.

Previous event: Partial Lunar Eclipse on Saturday, May 3, 1958

This event: Partial Lunar Eclipse on Thursday, May 13, 1976

Next event: Partial Lunar Eclipse on Wednesday, May 25, 1994

Visibility 
It was completely visible over South America, Europe, Africa, Asia and Australia, seen rising over South America, Europe and Africa, and setting over Asia and Australia. At the greatest eclipse about 12.17% of the Moon was covered by the Earth's shadow.

Related lunar eclipses

Eclipses in 1976 
 An annular solar eclipse on Thursday, 29 April 1976.
 A partial lunar eclipse on Thursday, 13 May 1976.
 A total solar eclipse on Saturday, 23 October 1976.
 A penumbral lunar eclipse on Saturday, 6 November 1976.

Lunar year series

Half-Saros cycle
A lunar eclipse will be preceded and followed by solar eclipses by 9 years and 5.5 days (a half saros). This lunar eclipse is related to two partial solar eclipses of Solar Saros 147.

See also 
List of lunar eclipses
List of 20th-century lunar eclipses

Notes

External links 
 

1976-05
1976 in science
May 1976 events